The Responder is a British police drama series set in Liverpool, written by former Merseyside Police officer Tony Schumacher, with Tim Mielants as leading director and starring Martin Freeman, Adelayo Adedayo, Ian Hart, and MyAnna Buring. It aired on BBC One on 24 January 2022. Schumacher has said that the character has "a lot to do" with him and the struggles he faced as a police officer, but that the storyline is fictional.

In late March 2022, the series was officially renewed for a second season.

Synopsis
Chris Carson is a police officer in a fictional constabulary covering Liverpool, who has been demoted from his position as an inspector and undertakes a series of night shifts in the city centre. Shots of him working are interspersed with scenes at therapy, at home, and with his mother in a nursing lodge. He is partnered with Rachel Hargreaves, an inexperienced and still idealistic officer who wants to play by the rules. Carl Sweeney is a mid-level drug dealer whose stash of cocaine has been stolen by Casey, a local drug addict.

Chris is trying to help Casey and, in doing so, crosses Carl. Other major characters include a naïve local man named Marco, who finds himself out of his depth.

Carson is a conflicted and compromised man, with somewhat divided loyalties, a desire to do good, but with a violent streak brought on by childhood trauma exacerbated by his experience in the police. He has been demoted from an inspector and is pursued by the officer responsible as part of a corruption probe, whose motives may not be entirely honest. The effects of the job and Chris' mental state take a toll on his family.

Cast and characters
 Martin Freeman as Chris Carson
 Adelayo Adedayo as Rachel Hargreaves, a probationary police officer
 Warren Brown as Raymond Mullen, a demoted officer with an axe to grind
 MyAnna Buring as Kate Carson, Chris' wife
 Emily Fairn as Casey, a drug addict
 Josh Finan as Marco, Casey's friend
 Philip S. McGuinness as Ian, Carl's henchman
 Mark Womack as Barry, Carl's henchman
 Ian Hart as Carl Sweeney, a drug dealer
 Rita Tushingham as June Carson, Chris' mother
 Philip Barantini as Steve, Rachel's boyfriend
 David Bradley as Davey, a local homeless man
 Kerrie Hayes as Ellie Mullen, Raymond's wife and Kate's best friend
 Faye McKeever as Jodie Sweeney, Carl's wife
 Philip Whitchurch as Joe, Casey's grandfather
 Christine Tremarco as Diane Gallagher, Greg's sister
 Amaka Okafor as Deborah Barnes, Chris' boss
 James Nelson-Joyce as Greg Gallagher, a drug lord
 Elizabeth Berrington as Lynne Renfrew, Chris' therapist
 Victor McGuire as Trevor
 Dominic Carter as Bernie Wilson
 Matthew Cottle as Father Liam Neeson
 Dave Hill as Billy
 Sylvie Gatrill as Mary
 Sonny Walker as Stevo Marsh
 James Ledsham as Enno
 Connor Dempsey as Kyle
 David Ayres as Andy
 Kieron Urquhart as Paul
 Harry Burke as Liam

Episodes

Release
The series premiered on BBC One on 24 January 2022. It aired in Australia in six episodes on SBS from 16 March 2022.

The series was shown by Canal plus in France. In Australia, the first season aired on SBS TV and SBS On Demand.

The first episode was watched 6,164,000 times on iPlayer alone during 2022, making it the third most-viewed individual programme on the platform that year.

The original soundtrack, composed by Matthew Herbert, was released by Accidental Editions in March 2022 and includes eighteen tracks.

Reception

Critical response
, review aggregator Rotten Tomatoes gave the series a 100% approval rating, with an average rating of 8.7/10, based on 15 reviews. The critics' consensus reads: "The Responder is unrelentingly dark and inescapably absorbing, with Martin Freeman's hangdog performance carrying the drama". On Metacritic, the series has a weighted average score of 86 out of 100, based on 9 reviews, indicating "universal acclaim".

Awards
 Best Drama 2022, Edinburgh TV Awards.

References

External links
 

2022 British television series debuts
2020s British drama television series
2020s British police procedural television series
BBC crime drama television shows
British detective television series
British thriller television series
English-language television shows
Police corruption in fiction
Television shows filmed in England
Television shows filmed in Northern Ireland
Television shows set in England
Television shows shot in Liverpool